Slieveanorra Forest is situated in the rural north of County Antrim, Northern Ireland, near the villages of Corkey and Newtown Crommelin. It is a vast conifer forest and offers panoramic views. Altnahinch Dam is located on the edge of the forest and many tourists visit the area during the summer. Many types of animal and plant life reside in the area. It is named after Slieveanorra [Sliabh an Earra, 'mountain of the tail/ridge'].The Battle of Aura took place on the surrounding mountain Slieve-na-Aura.

1942 airplane crash
In October 1942, a U.S. Air Force B17 Flying Fortress bomber crashed into a mountain beside the forest. The crash killed eight of the ten personnel on board.

References

External links
Slieveanorra forest from Forest Service Northern Ireland

Forests and woodlands of Northern Ireland
Geography of County Antrim
Protected areas of County Antrim
Northern Ireland Environment Agency properties
Nature reserves in Northern Ireland
Aviation accidents and incidents locations in Northern Ireland